

S 

 

S